Gummanur is a village in Dharmapuri district in the state of Tamil Nadu in India. 

Villages in Dharmapuri district